Captain Eric G. Kaniut  of the United States Navy served as the supervising officer over the 2005 OARDEC board, and the Administrative Review Boards convened for each detainee, at the Guantanamo Bay detention camp.

His 1994 Masters Thesis at the Naval Postgraduate School was entitled United Nations Reform: The Need for Legitimacy

He has been awarded two Defense Meritorious Service Medals, a Meritorious Service Medal, three Navy Commendation Medals and two Navy Achievement Medals.

Guantanamo
Initially the Bush Administration had ruled that the Department of Defense was not obliged to provide any opportunity for the Guantanamo captives to learn, and attempt to refute, the allegations used to justify their continued extrajudicial detention.

One of the effects of the United States Supreme Court's ruling in Rasul v. Bush was that the DoD had to provide an opportunity for the captives to learn and respond to the allegations against them.  The one-time Combatant Status Review Tribunals and the Administrative Review Boards were the "administrative procedures" the DoD designed to fulfill the Supreme Court's requirement.

According to the International Herald Tribune Kaniut asserted: 

One critic responded to Kaniut's description that the Tribunals and Boards were "just like a parole board" by asking.

According to The New Republic, Kaniut asserted that the protections these procedures provided were "unprecedented".

More than half the captives declined to attend their Administrative Review Board hearings.  When asked to explain the lack of participation Kaniut attributed it to the captive's cynicism.

In a profile in The Wire Kaniut said:
{| class="wikitable"
| 
“OARDEC was established about a year ago by the Secretary of Defense, who at that time, determined that there needs to be a review process for all the detainees at Guantanamo to determine which ones here still constitute a threat.”

...

“This is a tribute to America, JTF, and our country as a whole, that we even consider doing this.”
|}

References

External links

United States Navy officers
Living people
Year of birth missing (living people)